Jigoku-Retsuden (地獄烈伝, which roughly translates to "Legends from Hell / Hell's Legends"), also known as Kissology and Kiss Klassics, is a limited-edition CD/DVD set released in 2008 by the band Kiss, exclusively in Japan. The CD portion of the bundle includes 15 re-recorded classic Kiss tracks by the 2008 band line-up (Paul Stanley, Gene Simmons, Tommy Thayer, Eric Singer).

The DVD portion of the bundle is concert footage from a 1977 performance at Budokan Hall in Tokyo, Japan. The CD was re-released on October 6, 2009, by Kiss as part of a digipack deluxe edition of their album Sonic Boom along with concert footage from the Alive 35 Tour.

Track listing

DVD (Region 2)

CD personnel
Members
Paul Stanley – vocals, rhythm guitar
Gene Simmons – vocals, bass
Eric Singer – drums, vocals
Tommy Thayer – lead guitar, backing vocals

with
 Brian Whelan – piano

DVD personnel
Members
Paul Stanley – vocals, rhythm guitar
Gene Simmons – vocals, bass
Peter Criss – drums, vocals
Ace Frehley – lead guitar, backing vocals

References 

Albums produced by Gene Simmons
Albums produced by Paul Stanley
Kiss (band) compilation albums
Kiss (band) video albums
Live video albums
2008 video albums
2008 live albums
2008 greatest hits albums